AlienBabelTech started out as an international collaboration of computer enthusiasts and professionals.  It is an online computer and technology-related publication website that was officially launched on 1 October 2008.

Purpose 
AlienBabelTech is working with industry professionals and using its collective expertise and experience in an attempt to be the most valuable online information technology resource with open lines of communication and approachable staff.

Forums 
The AlienBabelTech forums currently has over 1000 registered users and over 55,000 posts. According to Alexa statistics, ABT, as it is known for short, has over 400 other sites linking in.

References

External links 
 AlienBabelTech
 AlienBabelTech Forums

Computing websites